Romina Oprandi was the defending champion, having won the last edition in 2012 as an ITF tournament, but chose not to participate.

Magda Linette won her first WTA Tour title, defeating Camila Giorgi in the final, 5–7, 7–5, 6–4.

Seeds
The top two seeds to participate received a bye into the second round.

Draw

Finals

Top half

Bottom half

Qualifying

Seeds

Qualifiers

Lucky losers

Draw

First qualifier

Second qualifier

Third qualifier

Fourth qualifier

Fifth qualifier

Sixth qualifier

References

External links
Main Draw
Qualifying Draw

2019 WTA Tour
2019 Singles